Emirates Business 24/7 was a business newspaper published in Dubai, the United Arab Emirates. The paper was started in 2007 to replace another one, Emirates Today. The publisher was Arab Media Group. The paper ceased its print version in July 2010 and became an online publication in 2010.

References

External links

2007 establishments in the United Arab Emirates
2010 disestablishments in the United Arab Emirates
Defunct newspapers published in the United Arab Emirates
English-language newspapers published in the United Arab Emirates
English-language websites
Mass media in Dubai
Publications established in 2007
Publications disestablished in 2010
Online newspapers with defunct print editions